Peter Juel-Jensen (born 18 May 1966 in Rønne) is a Danish politician, who is a member of the Folketing for the Venstre political party. He was elected into parliament at the 2007 Danish general election.

Political career
Juel-Jensen sat in the municipal council of Aakirkeby Municipality from 2001 to 2002, and of Bornholm Municipality from 2002 to 2007. He was elected into parliament in the 2007 election, and reelected in the 2011, 2015 and 2019 elections.

External links 
 Biography on the website of the Danish Parliament (Folketinget)

References 

1966 births
Living people
People from Bornholm
Danish municipal councillors
Venstre (Denmark) politicians
Members of the Folketing 2007–2011
Members of the Folketing 2011–2015
Members of the Folketing 2015–2019
Members of the Folketing 2019–2022
Members of the Folketing 2022–2026